Macroderoididae is a family of trematodes belonging to the order Plagiorchiida.

Genera

Genera:
 Alloglossidium Simer, 1929
 Alloglyptus Byrd, 1950
 Allomacroderoides Watson, 1976

References

Plagiorchiida